Lagenocypsela is a genus of New Guinean flowering plants in the family Asteraceae.

 Species
 Lagenocypsela latifolia (Mattf.) Swenson & K.Bremer - New Guinea
 Lagenocypsela papuana (J.Kost.) Swenson & K.Bremer - New Guinea

References

Astereae
Asteraceae genera
Endemic flora of New Guinea